Terance Reid (born 8 May 1957) is a South African cricketer. He played in 43 first-class and 11 List A matches for Eastern Province between 1977/78 and 1989/90.

See also
 List of Eastern Province representative cricketers

References

External links
 

1957 births
Living people
South African cricketers
Eastern Province cricketers
Cricketers from Port Elizabeth